Korean Air Flight 2033 was a scheduled passenger flight from Seoul to Jeju, South Korea. On 10 August 1994, the Airbus A300 serving the route overran the runway on landing at Jeju International Airport in poor weather and burst into flames. All 160 people on board escaped without serious injury, but the aircraft was destroyed.

History of the flight 

On the morning of 10 August, Korean Air Flight 2033 departed from Kimpo International Airport in Seoul for a one hour and ten minute domestic flight to Jeju. On board were 152 passengers and 8 crew.

On arrival at Jeju, shortly after 11:00 local time, the weather was poor, with driving rain and winds of up to  brought about by Typhoon Doug. The crew aborted their first approach. On their second attempt, the flaps were selected at a reduced setting (CONF3) due to the risk of windshear, which meant that the approach speed was higher than usual.

The aircraft touched down more than halfway down the runway, and was unable to stop within the remaining distance. All crew and passengers managed to safely evacuate via the emergency slides, before the fire consumed most of the aircraft. Only eight of the occupants suffered injuries, all minor ones.

Aircraft and crew 
The aircraft involved was a twin-jet Airbus A300B4-622R with South-Korean registration HL7296. It was delivered in 1990, and at the time of the accident was less than four years old. The captain for the flight was Canadian Barry Edward Woods, 52, and the first officer was Korean Chung Chan Kyu.

Aftermath 

In the days after the crash, both Woods and Kyu were arrested on suspicion of causing the accident by fighting over the controls. According to South Korean authorities, the first officer had attempted to initiate a go-around while the captain was determined to land the aircraft and bring it to a full stop.

References

Aviation accidents and incidents in 1994
Aviation accidents and incidents in South Korea
Accidents and incidents involving the Airbus A300
Korean Air accidents and incidents
History of Jeju Province
1994 in South Korea